The 6th FINA Short Course World Championships were held in Moscow, Russia on April 3–7, 2002. The event took place in the 25m-pool of the Olympiiski-complex, which also hosted the swimming event at the 1980 Summer Olympics. A record 599 swimmers from 92 countries competed at these championships, which resulted in seven world records.

Medal table

Results

Freestyle

Backstroke

Breaststroke

Butterfly

Medley

External links
Swim Rankings Results
Full results from OmegaTiming.com.
FINA website

FINA World Swimming Championships (25 m)
FINA Short Course World Championships
S
S
S
2002 in Moscow
Swimming competitions in Russia
April 2002 sports events in Europe